Reginald Hollingdale may refer to:

 R. J. Hollingdale (1930–2001), British biographer and translator of German philosophy and literature
 Reginald Hollingdale (cricketer) (1906–1989), Scottish cricketer